Matthew James Platt (born 3 October 1997) is an English professional footballer who plays as a defender for Bradford City.

Career

Blackburn Rovers
In November 2015 Platt signed a new professional contract at Blackburn Rovers penning a two and a half year deal.

In February 2017 Platt and his team mate, Connor Thomson, joined Barrow on loan. He made eight appearances for the Bluebirds during his short spell with the club.

In August 2017 he made his first team debut coming on as a substitute for Blackburn Rovers in an 2017–18 EFL Trophy game against Stoke City Under 21's.

On 3 August 2018, he joined newly-promoted League One side Accrington Stanley on a season-long loan deal. On 2 January he returned to Blackburn Rovers.

On 11 May 2019, he signed a new one-year contract with Blackburn Rovers until the summer of 2020.

Barrow
On 30 August 2019 he rejoined Barrow on loan until the end of the season. On 29 July 2020 he signed a two year deal with Barrow for an undisclosed fee.

Bradford City
In May 2022 it was announced that he would sign for Bradford City on 1 July 2022.

Career statistics

References

External links
 
 

1997 births
Living people
Blackburn Rovers F.C. players
Southport F.C. players
Accrington Stanley F.C. players
Barrow A.F.C. players
Bradford City A.F.C. players
English Football League players
National League (English football) players
Association football defenders
English footballers